Greatest Hits, Vol. 1 is a compilation album by American singer Nicky Jam released on November 4, 2014. This album contains eight songs that were previously released in Nicky Jam Hits, a remix of the song "Voy a Beber" with Ñejo and a new song, "Si Tú No Estás" with De La Ghetto.

Track listing

Charts

Weekly charts

Year-end charts

References

2014 albums
Nicky Jam albums